Moshi is one of the seven administrative districts of the Kilimanjaro Region of Tanzania. The District is bordered to the north by the Rombo District, to the west by the Hai District, to the east by the Mwanga District and Kenya, and to the south by Simanjiro District of Manyara Region. The district also surrounds Moshi Municipal District on three sides. 
According to the 2012 census, the population of the Moshi District was 466,737.

Administrative subdivisions

Wards 
The Moshi District is administratively divided into 31 wards:

 Arusha Chini
 Kahe
 Kahe Mashariki
 Kibosho Kati
 Kibosho Magharibi
 Kibosho Mashariki
 Kilema Kaskazini
 Kilema Kati
 Kilema Kusini
 Kimochi

 Kindi
 Kirima
 Kirua Vunjo Kusini
 Kirua Vunjo Magharibi
 Kirua Vunjo Mashariki
 Mamba Kaskazini
 Mamba Kusini
 Marangu Magharibi
 Marangu Mashariki
 Mabogini

 Makuyuni
 Mbokomu
 Mwika Kaskazini 
 Mwika Kusini
 Okoani
 Old Moshi Magharibi
 Old Moshi Mashariki
 Uru Mashariki
 Uru Shimbwe
 Uru Kusini
 Uru Kaskazini

Sister cities
Kiel (Germany) is a sister city of Moshi Rural.

References

Districts of Kilimanjaro Region